Grégoire Berg (31 March 1896 – 24 August 1944) was a French footballer who played for SC Red Star Strasbourg. He was part of the France national team, playing one match in 1922. A member of the French Resistance during the Second World War, who avoided deportation despite being Jewish (albeit non-practicising, and the husband and parent of Christians) Berg was arrested and executed by the Germans just before the Liberation of Paris on 24 August 1944.

References

External links
 

1896 births
1944 deaths
French footballers
France international footballers
Footballers from Rouen
French Resistance members
Resistance members killed by Nazi Germany
French civilians killed in World War II
French people executed by Nazi Germany
Association football defenders